David John Pryke (born 26 November 1970) is a South African former first-class cricketer.

References

External links

1970 births
Living people
Sportspeople from Welkom
South African cricketers
KwaZulu-Natal cricketers
North West cricketers
Marylebone Cricket Club cricketers
South Western Districts cricketers
South African cricket coaches